The 1952 WANFL season was the 68th season of senior football in Perth, Western Australia.

During the season, the Avon Valley Football Association applied to enter a team in the WANFL.

Ladder

Grand final

References

West Australian Football League seasons
WANFL